Serebryanka (Izmaylovka in a past - Robka) is a river in the north-east of Moscow, left tributary of , in turn a tributary of the Yauza.

Course

The total length of the river is 12 km, (8.6 km within borders of Moscow).

Tributaries
Several streams flowing into the Serebryanka inside Izmailovsky Urban Forest Park. They are Lipitinsky, Kosinsky, Red and Black brooks.

An artificial branch of the Serebryanka supplies Lebedyansky pond.

In addition, several ponds in Izmaylovsky Urban Forest Park belongs to basin Serebryanka river. They are the Red Pond, Decorative Pond, Deer Pond, and others.

Settlement
On the banks of Serebryanka stood villages Ivanovskoye, Cherkizovo and Izmaylovo (hence its second name - Izmaylovka).

Rivers of Moscow Oblast
Rivers of Moscow